Repo! The Genetic Opera: Original Motion Picture Soundtrack is the soundtrack to the 2008 rock opera horror/post-apocalyptic science fiction film of the same name.
The entire album is in the form of a rock opera, where every song is part of the same story. The songs do not appear on the album in chronological order.

Due to popular demand, the producers released a deluxe version of the soundtrack in February 2009 with additional tracks that included songs and pieces of the score.

Standard edition
The standard soundtrack is available only through Amazon.com. It is manufactured on demand on CD-R recordable media.

Track listing
All song music and lyrics composed by Darren Smith and Terrance Zdunich.

Video singles
To get better publicity of the film, the music and film producers released singles in video form on the official website. The videos were clips taken from the film and were released before the film was released.

Deluxe edition

Repo! The Genetic Opera: Original Motion Picture Soundtrack (Deluxe Edition) is an extended version of the original soundtrack to Repo! The Genetic Opera.

All the tracks from the previous release remain on the deluxe edition in the same order, with the new tracks placed in between some tracks. The only track that appears on both albums that differs is Zydrate Anatomy, where it is slightly longer on the deluxe edition.

The deluxe edition also contains score tracks. It is only available at selected Hot Topic stores, but not in the online shop.

Track listing
All song music and lyrics composed by Darren Smith and Terrance Zdunich.

Tracks listed with no performer are score pieces.

Track listing in film order

Tracks listed as 900+ are deleted scenes.

Selections from the Premiere Cast
A 7-track album entitled Repo! The Genetic Opera: Selections from the Premiere Cast was released on September 27, 2002, over 6 years before the film's release. The soundtrack consists of early versions of the songs used in the film, recorded by Repo! creators Darren Smith, Terrance Zdunich, and the premiere cast of the stage play.
 Curt Wilson as Nathan/Repo Man
 Lateefah Devoe as Blind Mag
 Terrance Zdunich as GraveRobber
 Stephanie Kane as Shilo
 Penny Wei as Heather (Amber Sweet's original name)

 "Night Surgeon" - Nathan/Repo Man
 "...But This is Opera!" - Blind Mag, Cyborg chorus
 "21st Century Cure" - GraveRobber, Shilo
 "Come Up and Try My New Parts" - Amber
 "Legal Assassin" - Nathan
 "Chase the Morning" - Blind Mag, Cyborg chorus
 "Choice" - Blind Mag, Nathan, Company

Pre-Surgery Sampler
The Pre-Surgery Sampler was released July 24, 2008 at a secret location on the film's official site. Hardcopies were also released at a convention on the same date.
 "A New World Organ"
 "At the Opera Tonight" - Shilo, Mag, Nathan, Amber, GraveRobber, Rotti, Luigi, Pavi
 "Zydrate Anatomy" - GraveRobber, Shilo, Amber, Chorus
 "Night Surgeon" - Nathan, Rotti, Gen-Terns, Luigi, Pavi
 "Chase the Morning" - Mag, Shilo, Marni
 "Seventeen" - Shilo, Chorus
 "Genetic Emancipation" - Shilo, Chorus

Personnel
Lionsgate:
 President of Music: Jay Faires
 General Manager & EVP, Business Affairs: Lenny Wohl
 Head of Soundtracks and Digital Music: Chris Fagot

Soundtrack:
 Producer: Joseph Bishara & Yoshiki
 Music and Lyrics: Darren Smith and Terrance Zdunich
 Associate Music Producer: Chris Spilfogel
 Score: Darren Smith
 Score Producer and Mixer: Joseph Bishara
 Engineering and Mixing: Chris Spilfogel and Cedrick Courtois
 Assistant Engineering: Zach Kasik
 Additional Engineers: Sean Lacefield, Zach Kasik and Ashburn Miller
 Digital Editor: Sean Lacefield
 Pre-Production Digital Editing: Paul Lani, Danny Sternbaum, and Tim Harkins
 Creative Consultant: Sean E. DeMott
 Lead Music Administrator: Erica Forster
 Music Assistant: Alisa Burket
 Vocal Coaches: Franni Burke, Brent Alan Huffman, Roger Love, Paul Masse and Eric Vetro
 Orchestrations: Jonathan Zalben and Darren Smith
 Italian Translation on "Chromaggia": Elena Tedros and Sara Suminski
 Music Transcriptions: C.J. Deangelus, Jr., Chris Guardino, Rohen Landa, Jonathan Zalben, Lev Zhurbin, MEDIANTMUSIC, LLC. and Darren Smith

Musicians
All listings apply to the Deluxe Edition version of the album.

Drums/percussion
 Mark "Moke" Bistany: Tracks 2, 7, 17, 30 & 36
 Tommy Clufetos: Tracks 6, 9 & 14
 Stephen Perkins: Tracks 3, 8, 9, 11, 13, 15 & 25
 Darren Smith: Tracks 3, 8, 10 & 25
 Ray Luzier: Tracks, 9, 11, 13, 19, 20, 21, 23, 24, 27, 29, 32, 34, 37 & 38
 Ryan Lacey: Track 15
 Shawn "Clown" Crahan (as M. Sean Crahan "Clown"): Track 17
 Pablo Amador: Track 22

Bass:
 Ashburn Miller: Tracks 2, 6, 9 & 17
 Joseph Bishara: Track 4
 Blasko: Tracks 7, 14, 34, 37 & 38
 David J: Tracks 11, 13, 14, 17, 24, 36,
 Darren Smith: Track 10, 12, 8 & 29
 Philip Bynoe: Tracks 19, 20, 23, 27, 29 & 30
 Ross O'Carrol: Track 22
 Sean Lacefield: Track 25

Guitars:
 Daniel Ash: Tracks 2, 4, 6, 9, 11, 14, 17, 26, 29, 34 & 36
 Sean Lacefield: Tracks 2, 4, 6, 9, 20, 25, 34 & 38
 Darren Smith: Tracks 2, 4, 5, 6, 7, 8, 9, 10, 14, 17, 18, 19, 20, 23, 24, 25, 26, 27, 28, 30, 32, 33, 34, 35, 36 & 38
 Brian Young: Tracks 2, 6, 7, 8, 18, 19, 20, 23, 24, 32, 36 & 37
 Cedrick Courtois: Tracks 4, 9, 34 & 38
 Sonny Moore: Tracks 4, 9 & 25
 Richard Patrick: Tracks 4, 14, 17 & 34
 Richard Fortus: Tracks 7 & 27
 Zach Kasik: Track 8
 Ian Smith: Track 22

Piano/keyboard:
 Darren Smith: Tracks 2, 3, 4, 9, 11, 12, 14, 15, 16, 18, 20, 21, 23, 24, 25, 26, 27, 28, 34, 35 & 37
 Saar Hendelman: Tracks 6, 17, 19, 21, 23, 24, 27, 29, 32 & 37
 Aaron Embry: Tracks 20 & 27
 Doron Kochli: Track 30

Violins:
 Jonathan Zalben: Tracks 2, 6, 7, 11, 17, 18, 24, 27, 30, 34 & 36
 Fred Bows: Tracks 5, 18, 25, 31, 34 & 35

Accordions:
 Rami Jaffee: Track 8
 Doron Kochli: Tracks 8 & 24
 Darren Smith: Tracks 12 & 25

Trumpet:
 Darren Smith: Tracks 10 & 15

Saxophones:
 C.J. DeAngelus, Jr.: Tracks 2 & 11

Additional vocals
Backing vocals:
Jacqueline Becker, Alisa Burket, Kate Conklin, Lateefah Devoe, Thomas Dolan, Richard Gould, Branden James, Erik Hart, Nancy Long, Gabriel Wyner, Nina Bergman, Cedrick Courtois, Sean Lacefield, Poe, Aidan Smith, Darren Smith, Chris Spilfogel, Joseph Bishara, Zach Kasik, Sanjay Nagar, Terrance Zdunich, Zakia Green, Thomasina Gross, Shaun Kama, Tracy Mullholland, Pablo Amador, Nic Cohn, Ross O'Carroll, Ian Smith, Brendan James, Curt Wilson, Laura Bosserman, Kristen DeCarlo, Jennifer Farmer, Lola Blanc, Suthi Picotte & Julia Voth

 Foreign Vocals on "A New World Organ": Ai Aota, Alisa Burket, Dapo Torimiro, Erica Forster, Jinny Lee, Alex Mannone, Martijn Terporten & Suthi Picotte
 Vocals on 'Lungs and Livers': Joseph Bishara, Zach Kasik, Sean Lacefield, Darren Smith & Chris Spilfogel
 Vocal Choir on "Worthy Heirs?": Timothy Carr, Nancy Long & Natalie Salins
 Vocals on 'A Ten Second Opera': Nancy Long
 Air Raid Siren voice on "21st Century Cure": Zakia Green

References

External links
 Official Soundtrack Website
 Official Movie Website

Rock operas
Rock soundtracks
2008 soundtrack albums
Lionsgate Records soundtracks
Science fiction film soundtracks
Musical film soundtracks
Horror film soundtracks